Emma Skou Færge (born 6 December 2000) is a Danish soccer player who plays defender for HB Køge in the Gjensidige Kvindeligaen and for the Denmark national team.

Career 

Færge started her career with Vildbjerg SF. After that, she signed for Kolding Q. In 2021, she signed for HB Køge.

She has previously played for the U16, U17, and U19 national teams. On 12 June 2022, she made her debut for the senior national team in a training match against Austria.

External links 

 Emma Færge's player profile in DBU's national team database
 Emma Færge's player profile on Soccerdonna.de
 Emma Færge's player profile on Soccerway

References 

HB Køge (women) players
Kolding IF players
Denmark international footballers
2000 births
Association football defenders
Women's association football defenders
Denmark women's youth international footballers
Danish women's footballers
Living people